Charlotte Melina Viall Wiser (1892–1981), born Charlotte Melina Viall, was an American anthropologist, and a Presbyterian rural-missionary to North India – Uttar Pradesh.

She authored several books, notably,  Behind Mud Walls and The Foods of a Hindu Village of North India. She received Kaiser-i-Hind Medal, an award given for public service in India.

Early life

Charlotte was born at Chicago, Illinois, and graduated from University of Chicago. While in furlough, she completed her MS degree in Nutrition from Cornell University in 1933.

She was sent as a Presbyterian missionary to India in 1916. She married William H. Wiser, another Presbyterian missionary arrived India in 1915, at Allahabad in 1916.  They had three sons – Arthur, Alfred, and Edward.

Missionary work
Her first term, including her husband's was to teach in Allahabad, and to do social work in Kanpur. She taught courses at the Allahabad Agricultural Institute. During their second term (1925–1930), they worked in Mainpuri, and lived in village Karimpur, near Agra, to get to know the village people and village life.

She and her husband spent most of their time in North India villages researching to improve the quality of Village life, after a period of six years in teaching from 1925. Initially, they did survey of a farming community to better understand the agriculture conditions. Later, they conducted extensive studies on the social, economic, and religious life of peasants between 1925 and 1930. Based on their survey, research, and experience in Indian Anthropology, she published several books like  Behind Mud Walls – in collaboration with her husband William wiser -, and  The Foods of a Hindu Village of North India in 1936—Charlotte submitted this dissertation to Conrell University as a master's thesis in Nutrition. These research books have become source of North Indian village life to be taught in colleges and universities of 
United States, especially in Iowa state.

Charlotte worked among Indian women and children from rural areas to help raise the standard of health. She ran baby shows like fairs demonstrating Western hygiene and childcare techniques. From 1945 to 1960, both Charlotte and her husband played pivotal and responsible role in the development and direction of Indian Village Service, a demonstration project for the improvement of village life. It later became a model for agencies involving in rural community development program—India's Block Development Program at Marehra, Etah district.

She returned to US in 1970, and died in December 1981.

Works
 For All of Life a Presbyterian Mission study book, in 1943.
 Four families of Karimpur, in 1978.
 Behind Mud Walls, in 1930–1960, 1970–1980.
 The Foods of a Hindu Village of North India, in 1936.

References

External links
William Hendricks Wiser and Charlotte Viall Wiser Papers (RG 128), Special Collections, Yale Divinity School Library.
 William Henricks and Charlotte Melina (Viall) Wiser Papers

1892 births
1981 deaths
American Presbyterian missionaries
Female Christian missionaries
Presbyterian missionaries in India
Recipients of the Kaisar-i-Hind Medal
Cornell University College of Agriculture and Life Sciences alumni
University of Chicago alumni
American expatriates in India
20th-century American anthropologists